The 1982 Speedway World Team Cup was the 23rd edition of the FIM Speedway World Team Cup to determine the team world champions.

The final took place on 15 August, at the White City Stadium in London. The United States won their first title.

Qualification

Round 1
 May 16
  King's Lynn, Norfolk Arena
 Referee:  C. Ringstrom

* England & USA to Intercontinental Final

Round 2
 May 16
  Stavanger

* Denmark & Sweden to Intercontinental Final

Round 3
 May 16
  Lonigo, Pista Speedway

* Czechoslovakia & Italy to Continental Semi-Final

Round 4
 May 16
  Miskolc

* Poland & Hungary to Continental Semi-Final

Tournament

See also
 1982 Individual Speedway World Championship
 1982 Speedway World Pairs Championship

References

World Team
Speedway World Team Cup

pl:Drużynowe Mistrzostwa Świata na żużlu 1980